Rhonda Baker (born September 17, 1968) is an American politician who has served in the Oklahoma House of Representatives from the 60th district since 2016.

Political career 

In 2016, District 60 incumbent Dan Fisher chose not to seek re-election. Baker ran for the seat, won a plurality of votes in a three-way Republican primary, went on to win the primary runoff, and defeated Democrat Dennis Purifoy in the general election. Baker ran for re-election in 2018; she defeated primary challenger Jacqueline Smith, and was unopposed in the general election. She is running again for re-election in 2020.

Electoral record 

Baker was unopposed in the 2018 general election.

References

1968 births
Living people
Republican Party members of the Oklahoma House of Representatives
21st-century American politicians
21st-century American women politicians
People from Yukon, Oklahoma
Women state legislators in Oklahoma